Dalen is the administrative centre of Tokke Municipality in Vestfold og Telemark county, Norway. The village is located at the flat river delta where the river Tokke flows into the west end of the lake Bandak.

The village of Dalen is the westernmost endpoint of the Telemark Canal which runs from Dalen to the town of Skien to the southeast. Dalen became a tourist site due to all the canal traffic. The Dalen Hotel, built in 1894, is among the largest wooden buildings in Norway.

The Tokke Hydroelectric Power Station is a hydroelectric power station that is located on the east side of Dalen. The power station exploits the change in height from the lake Vinjevatn to the lake Bandak at Dalen. Statkraft's regional headquarters for Eastern Norway are located in Dalen. This headquarters oversees and manages 38 power stations in the region. Dalen's population increased as the power systems were constructed during the 1950s, but then declined again after this finished by the 1960s.

Name
The village is named Dalen. In Norwegian, the preposition used for locations can vary depending on the name. "In Dalen" is translated på Dalen—literally "on Dalen".

References

Tokke
Villages in Vestfold og Telemark